Ring Djursland is a motor racing circuit in Pederstrup, Denmark. The circuit is owned by Tradium, who run daily driving courses there. It used to host rounds of the Danish Touringcar Championship and the Danish Thundersport Championship. it hosts the F4 Danish Championship since 2017, and TCR Denmark Touring Car Series since 2020.

Ring Djursland first opened in 1965, but was altered a year later to its current layout. In 1983 it was bought by the Danish state, who renovated the track to use it as an educational centre with advanced driving courses for lorry drivers. After losing its environmental permit in the late 1980s, it reopened for racing in 1994.

Lap records

The official race lap records at the Ring Djursland are listed as:

References

External links

Official website
Ring Djursland at etracks

Motorsport venues in Denmark